Fryingpan Glacier is on the eastern face of the  Little Tahoma Peak, just to the east of Mount Rainier in the U.S. state of Washington. The glacier is located on top of a cliff from the Emmons Glacier to the north and a small ridge separates this glacier from the Whitman Glacier to the south, except for a small snowfield in which these two glaciers are connected. Numerous snowfields and alpine meadows are located near the bottom and east of the glacier. Meltwater from the glacier drains into the White River.

See also
List of glaciers in the United States

References

Glaciers of Mount Rainier
Glaciers of Washington (state)